Rodrigo Heng-Lehtinen (born April 1, 1986) is an American LGBT rights advocate.

Early life and education
Born in Miami, Florida Heng-Lehtinen is a graduate of Palmer Trinity School. In high school, he was active in a dramatic arts club and mountaineering team, served in the Honor Council, and founded a chapter of Amnesty International. He began living openly as a transgender man while attending Brown University, and later came out to his parents.

Career
Heng-Lehtinen was a member of Queer Alliance at Brown University. While attending Brown, he produced the documentary, Free Within These Walls, about Cuban prisoners of conscience. Heng-Lehtinen was a field organizer for the National Gay and Lesbian Task Force. Later, he was the Membership Director at Gender Justice LA, a grassroots organization that works to build the power of the transgender community in Los Angeles through community organizing and leadership development. He also worked in fundraising at Liberty Hill Foundation, organized a transgender leadership development conference with the Transgender Law Center, and served as the membership manager at GLAAD, an LGBT media advocacy organization.

In May 2015, Heng-Lehtinen was honored by the LGBT-rights group, SAVE Dade, at its 2015 Champions of Equality reception. He was honored for appearing with his mother in a highly rated television interview, increasing visibility of the transgender community.

In May 2016, Heng-Lehtinen and his parents appeared in a public service announcement titled "Family is Everything", which discusses his family's personal journey and acceptance, that all South Florida families should embrace their children, and the reason why all Americans should have the same opportunities regardless of gender identity or sexual orientation.

Heng-Lehtinen was the public education director at Freedom For All Americans, the national campaign for LGBT nondiscrimination protections.

Heng-Lehtinen became Deputy Executive Director for Policy and Action at the National Center for Transgender Equality on July 1, 2019.

In 2022, Heng-Lehtinen appeared in The Daily Wire documentary What Is a Woman?, during which he talked about the issue of transgender people in sports.

Personal life
Heng-Lehtinen is the older child of attorney and politician Dexter Lehtinen and former congresswoman Ileana Ros-Lehtinen. He is the grandson of author Enrique Ros. He is the first openly-transgender child of a member of Congress.

References

1986 births
American people of Cuban-Jewish descent
American people of Finnish descent
American people of Turkish-Jewish descent
Brown University alumni
American LGBT rights activists
Living people
LGBT Hispanic and Latino American people
LGBT people from Florida
People from Miami
American transgender people
Transgender men